Halgerda leopardalis is a species of sea slug, a dorid nudibranch, a shell-less marine gastropod mollusk in the family Discodorididae.

Distribution

References

Discodorididae
Gastropods described in 2018